This is a list of supermarket chains in Philippines.

Current supermarket chains

All Day Supermarket (Villar Group)
Budgetlane
Chain Mart
Cash & Carry
Makati Supermarket Alabang
Unimart
Citimart
City Supermarket, Inc.
Ever Supermarket
Fisher Supermarket
 Gaisano Capital
 Gaisano G Market (Gaisano Supermarket under DSG Sons Group; not to be confused with G-Market in South Korea)
 Gaisano Grand Supermarket
Metro Retail Stores Group (formerly Metro Gaisano; not to be confused with Metro Cash & Carry in Germany)
Super Metro Gaisano
Iloilo Society Commercial, Inc.
Iloilo Supermart
Injap Supermart (MerryMart Grocery Centers Inc.)
Isetann
 KCC Supermarket
The Landmark Supermarket
 LCC Supermarket
Lopue's
 NCCC Supermarket
NE Supermarket
Prince Hypermart
Puregold Price Club, Inc.
Puregold
Minimart by Puregold
Puregold Price Club
Parco Supermarket
S&R
Merkado Supermarket (joint venture with Ayala Land)
Robinsons Retail Holdings, Inc.
Robinsons Supermarket
Robinsons EasyMart
Jaynith's Supermarket
The Marketplace (formerly Rustan's Supermarket and Robinsons Selections)
Wellcome
Shopwise
Shopwise Express
SM Markets (a division of SM Retail)
SM Supermarket
SaveMore Market
SM Hypermarket
South Supermarket
Southeast Asia Retail
Landers Superstore
Super 8 Grocery Warehouse
Unitop Supermarket
Ultra Mega
Vercons Supermarket
WalterMart Supermarket IGA

Defunct supermarket chains
TOBY's (taken over by Robinsons Retail Holdings Inc.)
Pilipinas Makro (initially fully taken over by SM and all branches subsequently converted into SM Hypermarkets, Savemore Markets or abandoned)
Glo-ri's Supermart (acquired by SM from Glorimart Inc. and all branches subsequently converted into Savemore Markets)
Queen's Supermart (after 1981 Harrison Plaza fire, and reopening in the 1984, it was replaced by Rustan's Supermarket, before eventually converted into Shopwise)
Rustan's Supermarket (discontinued following takeover by Robinsons Retail Holdings Inc.)

Gallery

References

External links
 Shopwise
 Citimart
 SM Markets

Philippines
 
Supermarket chains